Dan Travers (also known as Daniel Travers; born 16 June 1956) is a former British badminton player and National coach.

About 
Travers was a bronze medalist at the 1981 World Games, losing out to Swedish pair in semifinals. Travers competed in three commonwealth games in 1978, 1986 & 1990. He is a former Commonwealth games champion of 1986 in men's doubles with Gilliland, first ever player(s) in history of Scottish badminton to be a gold medalist. Until now, they remain only gold medalist from their country. They also reached career high of World no. 2 after their stellar display at the All England in 1982.
In 1986 along with Billy Gilliland, they were awarded with BBC Scotland Sportsperson of the year.
He became National coach of Scotland in 1997 and later president of BadmintonScotland and has coached players at many Commonwealth games & other championships, even playing competitive sport himself at the senior level. He is a numerous time European Senior Champion and World Senior Champion as well.

Travers is married to Aileen Travers, a former international player.

Achievements

World Games 
Men's doubles

Commonwealth Games 
Men's doubles

European Championships 
Men's doubles

IBF World Grand Prix 
The World Badminton Grand Prix sanctioned by International Badminton Federation (IBF) from 1983 to 2006.

Men's doubles

Open tournaments 
Men's singles

Men's doubles

Mixed doubles

IBF International 
Men's singles

Men's doubles

Mixed doubles

References

External links 

 
 
 
 

1956 births
Living people
Scottish male badminton players
Commonwealth Games medallists in badminton
Commonwealth Games gold medallists for Scotland
Badminton players at the 1978 Commonwealth Games
Badminton players at the 1986 Commonwealth Games
Badminton players at the 1990 Commonwealth Games
World Games medalists in badminton
World Games bronze medalists
Competitors at the 1981 World Games
Medallists at the 1986 Commonwealth Games